Zemacies ordinaria is an extinct species of sea snail, a marine gastropod mollusk in the family Borsoniidae.

Description
The whorls increase rapidly in size on this very narrow shell. The nodular axials are more or less restricted to the periphery. The subsutural fold is obsolete. There are 21–22 strong nodules per whorl.

Distribution
This extinct marine species is endemic to New Zealand and was found in Lower Miocene strata.

References

 P. Marshall, Trans. N. Z. Inst., vol. 50, p. 268, pl. 20, fig. 4, 4a
 Maxwell, P.A. (2009). Cenozoic Mollusca. pp. 232–254 in Gordon, D.P. (ed.) New Zealand inventory of biodiversity. Volume one. Kingdom Animalia: Radiata, Lophotrochozoa, Deuterostomia. Canterbury University Press, Christchurch.

ordinaria
Gastropods of New Zealand
Gastropods described in 1918